Julio is a Spanish male surname or family name. It can also be a first name / given name. See Julio (given name).

The equivalent in Portuguese is the accented Júlio

It may refer to:

 Agustín Julio (born 1974), Colombian football player
 David Júlio (born 1932), South African-born Portuguese football player
 Deivi Julio (born 1980), Colombian amateur boxer and Olympian
 Ener Julio (born 1973), Colombian boxer
 Geraldo Júlio (born 1971), Brazilian politician
 Joel Julio (born 1985), Colombian boxer
 Jorge Julio (born 1979), Major League Baseball relief pitcher
 María Cristina Julio (born 1999), Chilean footballer

See also 
 Julio (disambiguation)
 Júlio

References